Andrew David McBride (born 15 March 1954) is an English retired professional footballer who played in England and the United States as a central defender.

Career
Born in Nakuru, Kenya Colony, McBride began his career as an apprentice at Crystal Palace, making one league appearance during the 1973–74 season. He later played in the South Africa and the United States for Cape Town City, Hellenic, Jewish Guild, Highlands Park, California Surf and Pittsburgh Spirit.

References

1954 births
Living people
English footballers
Crystal Palace F.C. players
Cape Town City F.C. (NFL) players
Hellenic F.C. players
Jewish Guild players
Highlands Park F.C. players
California Surf players
Pittsburgh Spirit players
English Football League players
North American Soccer League (1968–1984) indoor players
North American Soccer League (1968–1984) players
Major Indoor Soccer League (1978–1992) players
Association football defenders
English expatriate footballers
English expatriate sportspeople in South Africa
Expatriate soccer players in South Africa
English expatriate sportspeople in the United States
Expatriate soccer players in the United States
National Football League (South Africa) players